Fort Dauphin may refer to:

Canada
 Fort Dauphin (Manitoba), in Manitoba
 Fort Dauphin (Nova Scotia), in Nova Scotia

Haiti
 Fort-Liberté in Haiti

Madagascar
 Fort Dauphin (Madagascar)